Live at the El Mocambo is the second live album by the Canadian rock band April Wine, released in 1977.

Overview
The album was recorded during performances at Toronto's El Mocambo club on 4 and 5 March 1977 when April Wine opened for The Rolling Stones during one of the surprise club appearances for which the Stones are renowned, and during which they recorded part of their own live album Love You Live (1977).

Live at the El Mocambo was produced and engineered by Eddie Kramer, best known for his work with the Stones, Jimi Hendrix, and Led Zeppelin.

Track listing
Side one:
 "Teenage Love" – (B. Segarini) – 3:36
 "Tonite is a Wonderful Time to Fall in Love" – (M. Goodwyn) – 4:01
 "Juvenile Delinquent" – (B. Segarini) – 4:53
 "Don't Push Me Around" – (M. Goodwyn) – 6:19

Side two:
 "Oowatanite" – (J. Clench) – 4:23
 "Drop Your Guns" – (D. Henman) – 4:22
 "Slow Poke" – (M. Goodwyn) – 4:30
 "She's No Angel" – (M. Goodwyn, G. Moffet) – 3:25
 "You Could Have Been a Lady" – (E. Brown, T. Wilson) – 3:52

Personnel
 Myles Goodwyn: Lead vocals, guitar
 Gary Moffet: Guitar, background vocals
 Steve Lang: Bass, background vocals, lead vocals on "Oowatanite"
 Jerry Mercer: Drums, background vocals

Production
 Eddie Kramer – Producer/Engineer
 Myles Goodwyn – Producer ("She's No Angel")
 George Marino – Mastering
 Bob Lemm – Design and illustrations

References

April Wine albums
Albums produced by Eddie Kramer
1977 live albums
Aquarius Records (Canada) live albums
London Records live albums
1977 in Canadian music
Albums recorded at the El Mocambo
Music of Toronto